Torsten Gustav Magnus Henning Grönfors (8 August 1888 – 28 May 1968) was a Swedish sailor and tennis player who competed in the 1912 Summer Olympics.

He was a crew member of the Swedish boat R. S. Y. C., which finished fifth in the 8 metre class competition.

In the men's singles indoor tennis tournament he was eliminated in the round of 16 by Anthony Wilding who later won the bronze medal. In the outdoor singles tournament he was eliminated in the round of 32.

In the outdoor men's doubles event he and his partner Frans Möller were eliminated in the first round. In the outdoor mixed doubles he lost with his partner Annie Holmström in the quarter-finals.

References 

1888 births
1968 deaths
Sportspeople from Lund
Swedish male sailors (sport)
Swedish male tennis players
Olympic sailors of Sweden
Olympic tennis players of Sweden
Sailors at the 1912 Summer Olympics – 8 Metre
Tennis players at the 1912 Summer Olympics
20th-century Swedish people